The  Eastern League season began on approximately April 1 and the regular season ended on approximately September 1. 

The Binghamton Mets defeated the Canton–Akron Indians 3 games to 2 to win the Eastern League Championship Series.

Regular season

Standings

Note: Green shade indicates that team advanced to the playoffs; Bold indicates that team advanced to ELCS; Italics indicates that team won ELCS

Playoffs

Semi-finals Series
The Binghamton Mets defeated the Harrisburg Senators 3 games to 1.
The Canton–Akron Indians defeated the Albany-Colonie Yankees 3 games to 1.

Championship Series
The Binghamton Mets defeated the Canton–Akron Indians in the ELCS 3 games to 2.

References

External links
1992 Eastern League Review at thebaseballcube.com

Eastern League seasons